Nagesvara Temple is a functioning Hindu temple located in the village of Bhubaneswar, Odisha, India.  It is situated on the

Description
Nagesvara Temple is located in the midst of a residential area within the city of Bhubaneswar which is the capital of the state of Odisha in India.

The garbha griha of the temple is established with a Shivling of approximately 2.5 feet height and 1.5 feet diameter. The sculptural embellishments on the outer wall of the temple contain Parvati to the North, Kartikeya to the East and Ganesha to the South, the family members of lord Siva.

The temple incorporates numerous niches for statuary, in addition to the ones for Parvati, Kartikeya and Ganesha.  The exterior of the temple is made from ochrous sandstone (resembling the material of the Mukteshvara Temple) that is ornately carved in the style of the Kalinga Kingdom.

History
Local residents believe the temple was built by the Kesharis.

Preservation status
The temple today is in generally good condition, except for some surfaces that have deteriorated.

See also
 List of temples in Bhubaneswar

References

External links
 Photos of the temple

Hindu temples in Bhubaneswar